The flag of the vice president of the Philippines consists of the vice presidential coat of arms on a white background. The current flag is defined in Executive Order 310 signed by President Gloria Macapagal Arroyo:

History
The flag was first defined in 1947 by Executive Order No. 38 (s. 1947) signed by President Manuel Roxas, in which the Presidential Flag and Seal were created. It indicated that the Vice Presidential flag will follow the pattern of the President's, except that the sun and the corner stars were to be blue to create a distinction.

After President Elpidio Quirino amended Roxas' order under Executive Order No. 457 (s. 1951), he changed the design of the coat of arms, and ordered that it will be identical to the President's, but without the ring of stars. This version of the flag was used until 1972 when the office was abolished by Martial Law and subsequently excluded from the original text of the 1973 Constitution.

After the position was restored in 1986, a literal reading of Quirino's order caused confusion as to the appearance of the flag and the coat of arms. While the government adopted the seal with a blue background, they have adopted a flag in white background.

To clarify the subsequent executive orders regarding the Vice Presidential coat-of-arms, seal and flag, President Gloria Macapagal Arroyo in 2004 signed Executive Order No. 310, defining the design of both positions' coats-of-arms, seals and flags.

Historical flags

References

See also
Vice President of the Philippines
Seal of the Vice President of the Philippines
Flag of the President of the Philippines

Vice President of the Philippines
Flag
Flags displaying animals